The Nigerian Navy Secondary School Abeokuta, is a secondary school located in Abeokuta, Ogun State, Nigeria. It was founded in 1990 but the first set of students attended on 2 March 1991. The school offers academic and Military Training to students for the purpose of installing discipline, morals and Physicality to the able to perform better in Life. Although the Military Training offered is milder than that of actual soldiers, it offers knowledge and easier pathways for individuals wanting to start a career in the Military and Pararmilitary agencies

Background 
As at 1990, it became evident that the children of personnel seeking admission in the only secondary school of the Nigerian Navy at Ojo was becoming too large for the school. Many states were contacted by the Nigerian Navy on assistance for a site. The then Governor of Ogun State, a naval personnel himself, Navy Captain Mohammed Lawal, invited the Nigerian Navy to consider a location of the defunct St Leo's Teachers' Training College at Ibara Abeokuta (www.nnssab.net)on a hilly Onikolobo site.  This premises had been abandoned and merely serve as a route to the Catholic Compound and was also used for administering a newly conceived secondary school in that name.  The Nigerian Navy considered the site and found it suitable.  A team of officers headed by Commodore SO Lawuyi, the Chief of Naval Education, Lt Cdr SEA Olamilokun, SO 1 Education at Naval Headquarters, SLt Nelson Demebide and a civilian architect, were sent to receive the compound.  The team took inventories of the facilities at the site and made recommendations for its renovations.

Historical Perspective 
Nigerian Navy Secondary School, Abeokuta was founded on 2 February 1991 and is sited at the former St Leo's Teachers' College at Ibara Abeokuta, Ogun State of Nigeria. At the handing over ceremony on that day, the Ogun State Military Governor, Navy Captain Oladeinde Joseph, commended the Nigerian Navy for bringing a model secondary school to Abeokuta.  The then Chief of the Naval Staff, Admiral Murtala Nyako implored the school to train the children who would excel in all. He emphasized that the Nigerian Navy Secondary School Abeokuta, although a civilian secondary school, should be seen as the Nigerian Navy's equivalent of a military school and should be run as such.

First Students 
The school started with 623 students admitted into Junior Secondary 1 and Junior Secondary School 2. The pioneer commandant was Lieutenant Commander SEA Olamilokun who took over command of the school on 20 November 1990. The first executive officer was Lieutenant SJ Ajiboye.  Some of the pioneering staff were Mrs OA Okunneye, Miss Nwogbo, Miss Ante, Mr Soyode, Mr Osinowo, Mr. Oladele and Mr Agoreyo Armstrong.  Other members of staff were SLt Chukwu, Mrs Salako, Miss Ajimati and Mr Adesanya.

The first date of any student at school was 3 March 1991.  NNSS Abeokuta is an all-boys all boarding school with mild military activities, mainly drills.

The Ogun State Government, under the administration of Navy Captain Mohammed Lawal, initiated the complete renovation of all the existing buildings and the major roads in the compound. It also provided an alternative bypass to the priest house.

The NN appointed the first commandant to the school on 20 November 1990. The new commandant, Lt Cdr SEA Olamilokun, assumed duties and moved to the compound with his key staff officers. On 2 February 1991, the new Governor of the State, Governor Oladeinde Joseph handed over the school formally to the Chief of the Naval Staff, Vice Admiral MAH Nyako.  It is instructive to note that many senior officers were present at the handing over ceremony. The Governor of Oyo State, Col Adisa who was present promised to build a Guard House for the School, while the Ogun State Government promised to refurbish 3 vehicles for use of the school and refurbish its administrative block.  Navy Captain Olukoya, the Governor of Ondo State promised to donate a staff car for the commandant and provide a bus for the students.  All the promises were fulfilled.

Current State 
Now the school has a student strength of 1060, these pupils are called "navy boys". The students are divided into four houses:
Blue house (Aikhomu house)
Green house (Nyako house)
Purple house (Koshoni house)
Red house (Omatsola house, originally called Kennedy house)
These houses are all named after famous navy officers of the country, each house has 4 divisions in them so that there are a total of 16 divisions in the whole school (divisions "ALPHA" to "PAPA"). The youngest students start at the first set of four divisions in the blue house (Aikhomu)  and as they progress in their academic years, they also progress in division groups.

The daily routines of the students are as follows:-
05:30 - time to muster for daily assignments (chores or early morning drills)
06:30 - students go to the dining hall (which students call "galley") for breakfast
07:30 - parade time which involves flying the flag, messages from the commandant and march past
08:45 - lesson begin
14:30 - lessons end
14:30 - lunch time
15:00 - siesta and guard officers patrol
16:00 - afternoon prep (for homework and class assignments)
17:00 - student's free time, training, activities, laundry or labor duties
18:00 - dinner time
19:00 - evening prep
21:30 - end of prep 
22:00 - lights out the whole school.

(schedules and activities differ according to days of the week for different year groups and divisions)

Nigerian Navy Secondary School (a.k.a. NNSS) focuses mainly on hard work and discipline which is the school motto and the students believe firmly in the Nigerian Navy phrase 'Forward ever, Backward never'. They are taught teamwork, hence their slogan "Onward Together".

Entry Requirements 
For admission into NNSS, applicants need to be of above average intellectual capabilities: they must excel in their entrance examinations and interview which test on mathematical, linguistic, structural logic (quantitative) and analytical (qualitative) abilities.

Old Students 
The Old Students came together recently to form Old Boys Association. A new president for the old boys was appointed and the executive formed. Present at the inauguration of the old students' inauguration were 3 former commandants, one former executive officer and the first VP Academics. It was a great reunion of old teachers, students, and present teachers. The present Director of Naval Education, Commodore Olatunji Olawumi was in attendance and so was Commodore SEA Olamilokun, the  pioneering Commandant. Captain Isaac Mankilik, the Commandant, implored the old student to work for the progress of the School through networking and purposeful participation.

References

Military schools in Nigeria
Nigerian Navy
Boys' schools in Nigeria
Secondary schools in Ogun State
Schools in Abeokuta
Educational institutions established in 1990
1990 establishments in Nigeria